Ghosts is an anthology of themed fantasy and science fiction short stories on the subject of ghosts edited by Isaac Asimov, Martin H. Greenberg and Charles G. Waugh as the tenth volume in their Isaac Asimov's Magical Worlds of Fantasy series. It was first published in paperback by Signet/New American Library in December 1988. The first British edition was issued in trade paperback by Robinson in October 1989.

The book collects fourteen novelettes and short stories by various fantasy and science fiction authors, with an introduction by Asimov.

Contents
"Introduction: Ghosts" (Isaac Asimov)
"Ringing the Changes" (Robert Aickman)
"Author! Author!" (Isaac Asimov)
"Touring" (Michael Swanwick, Gardner Dozois and Jack M. Dann)
"The Wind in the Rose-Bush" (Mary E. Wilkins Freeman)
"Come Dance With Me On My Pony's Grave" (Charles L. Grant)
"The Fire When It Comes" (Parke Godwin)
"The Toll-House" (W. W. Jacobs)
"The Invasion of the Church of the Holy Ghost" (Russell Kirk)
"A Terrible Vengeance" (Charlotte Riddell)
"Elle Est Trois, (La Mort)" (Tanith Lee)
"A Passion for History" (Stephen Minot)
"Daemon" (C. L. Moore)
"The Lady's Maid's Bell" (Edith Wharton)
"The King of Thieves" (Jack Vance)

Notes

1988 anthologies
Fantasy anthologies
Science fiction anthologies
Martin H. Greenberg anthologies
Ghosts in written fiction
Signet Books books